The Martinsville Phillies were a short season minor league baseball team located in Martinsville, Virginia. Affiliated with the Philadelphia Phillies, they existed from 1988 to 1998, playing in the Appalachian League. They played their home games at Hooker Field. Martinsville was also home to the Martinsville Astros (1999-2003), Martinsville A's (1945-1949) and the Martinsville Manufacturers (1934-1941).

Notable Martinsville alumni

Gary Bennett
Toby Borland
Ricky Bottalico (1991) MLB All-Star
Jason Boyd
Bobby Estalella
Tony Fiore
Jason Kershner
Mike Lieberthal (1990) 2 x MLB All-Star
Ryan Madson
Scott Rolen 7x MLB All Star; 1997 NL Rookie of the Year
Jimmy Rollins (1996) 3x MLB All-Star; 2007 NL Most Valuable Player
Carlos Silva (1996)
Reggie Taylor
Derrick Turnbow
Bob Wells
Ricky Williams

Year-by-year record

References

External links
The Baseball Cube

Martinsville, Virginia
Defunct Appalachian League teams
Philadelphia Phillies minor league affiliates
Defunct baseball teams in Virginia
Baseball teams established in 1988
Baseball teams disestablished in 1998
1988 establishments in Virginia
1998 disestablishments in Virginia